Stockton High School may refer to:

Fort Stockton High School, Fort Stockton, Texas
Linton-Stockton High School, Linton, Indiana
Stockton High School (California), former school in Stockton Unified School District 
Stockton High School (Illinois), Stockton, Illinois
Stockton High School (Missouri), Stockton, Missouri